The Halton Catholic District School Board (HCDSB) serves over 37,000 students at its 46 elementary schools, 9 secondary schools and 3 continuing education facilities. The HCDSB serves the communities of Burlington, Halton Hills, Milton, and Oakville, with the main Board office (Catholic Education Centre) located in Burlington, Ontario, Canada.

The Halton Catholic District School Board is the Catholic school board for the Halton region.

History
The Halton Catholic District School Board traces its roots back to 1856 when the founder Robin Smith and Father Morgan Rex-Ryan founded St. Mary's School – the first Catholic elementary school in Oakville to establish education programs for Catholic children in the town of Oakville. A separate school zone was formally established in 1856, in which the Oakville Separate School Board was constituted. Under provincial legislation, separate school zones were later formed in Burlington, Georgetown and Milton.

As part of a province-wide restructuring of school boards initiated by then Minister of Education Bill Davis, Halton's separate school boards were merged to form the Halton County Roman Catholic Separate School Board, which came into effect on January 1, 1969. As a result of the formation of the Regional Municipality of Halton in 1974, it became the "Halton Roman Catholic Separate School Board", and its jurisdiction was extended to the entire Region.

In the years following amalgamation, the Board witnessed, not only the physical growth of its English language schools, but also the development of French language schools, and the eventual establishment of a French Language Section of the Board to govern the three French-language schools in 1986.

In the late 1970s, the school board ventured into the area of secondary education, and, assisted by the legislative provision for full funding to Ontario's Catholic secondary schools in 1986, established five secondary schools, later adding four more:

Amalgamation also opened the school system to special needs students, and as a result the Special Education Department was created. This occurred in advance of provincial legislation passed in 1980 on the matter.

In 1986, the new department of Continuing Education Services was created, which first operated out of a portable classroom at the Board's Drury Lane Catholic Education Centre.

Over the same years, the Board dealt with unprecedented growthparticularly in the southern half of Halton Regionculminating in increased demands on the education system and numerous changes in the education field itself.

As part of the province-wide restructuring of Ontario's school boards as a consequence of the passage of the Fewer School Boards Act, 1997, the Board's schools were transferred to the following new bodies:

 the English-language Separate District School Board No. 46 (which was merged with the former Board at the beginning of 1998), and
 the French-language Separate District School Board No. 64 (which later became the Conseil scolaire de district catholique Centre-Sud).

The English-language Separate District School Board No. 46 was renamed as the "Halton Catholic District School Board" in 1999.

About the board
The Halton Catholic District School Board provides educational services to over 37,000 students of all ages, in 46 elementary schools, 9 high schools, and three continuing education facilities.

Board of Trustees 

The HCDSB Board of Trustees consists of nine elected Trustees, which are elected every four years during the municipal election. There are three trustees representing Burlington, one representing Halton Hills, two representing Milton, and three representing Oakville, respectively.

Student Trustees 

As required by the Ontario Ministry of Education, the HCDSB keeps three student trustees. The student trustees are elected every year by the student senate. There are three student trustees, one for Oakville, one for Burlington, and one to represent the entirety of North Halton (Milton, Georgetown, Acton, Halton Hills). Student trustees attend all regular board meetings, although their vote is non-binding. They are allowed to voice their opinions on issues important to students in the board. The following students have been elected to serve on the Board.

Student Senate 
The Student Senate is a committee of approximately 80 members (3-8 from each secondary school) designed as an advisory body to the Student Trustees, which in turn relay their concerns or recommendations to regular Board Meetings. Student Senators are picked yearly, through an application process. All students are eligible to apply, with the exception of ninth graders as the application process ends the year before.

Schools

Continuing Education
Thomas Merton Centre for Continuing Education (Burlington)
Thomas Merton Centre for Continuing Education (Milton)
Thomas Merton Centre for Continuing Education (Oakville)
Source:

Families of Schools

Source:

See also
Halton District School Board
List of school districts in Ontario
List of high schools in Ontario

Further reading

References

External links
 Halton Catholic District School Board

Roman Catholic school districts in Ontario
Education in Burlington, Ontario
Education in the Regional Municipality of Halton